Rainer Pottel (born 29 August 1953 in Berlin) is a retired decathlete, who represented East Germany in the 1970s and 1980s. He had the best performance in the world in 1981, collecting 8,334 points at a meet in Birmingham, England (30 August 1981). He is a three-time national champion (1974, 1977 and 1981) for East Germany in the men's decathlon.

References

Sources
 1981 Year List
 GBRathletics
 sports-reference

1953 births
Living people
East German decathletes
Athletes (track and field) at the 1980 Summer Olympics
Olympic athletes of East Germany
Athletes from Berlin